The Council Ranger Station located in Council, Idaho, listed on the National Register of Historic Places.

It is a complex of five frame buildings, and associated landscaping.

See also

 List of National Historic Landmarks in Idaho
 National Register of Historic Places listings in Adams County, Idaho

References

Buildings and structures in Adams County, Idaho
Park buildings and structures on the National Register of Historic Places in Idaho
1933 establishments in Idaho
National Register of Historic Places in Adams County, Idaho